Kuguiyeh (also Romanized as Kūgū’īyeh; also known as Gūgū’īyeh and Kūgū) is a village in Ganjabad Rural District, Esmaili District, Anbarabad County, Kerman Province, Iran. At the 2006 census, its population was 496, in 106 families.

References 

Populated places in Anbarabad County